Ardmore is a large rural locality of Auckland, New Zealand, located to the south-east of Auckland CBD, just 27 km away. The suburb is in the Franklin Ward, one of the thirteen administrative divisions of Auckland, and is under local governance of Auckland Council.

History 

The area contains Ardmore Airport, which is one of Auckland's busiest airports due to Ardmore Flying School. This rural tranquility is located just to the east of the Auckland Metropolitan Area with Papakura being the closest town (within the Auckland urban area). Ardmore has a state co-educational primary school which provides education for the local children but the older teenaged children are sent to several colleges throughout the Auckland area.

Ardmore Teachers' Training College was situated adjacent to the airfield from 1948 to 1974. The college opened in 1948 to help address the shortage of teachers in New Zealand caused by the 'baby boom' after WW2. It was New Zealand's only fully residential teachers' college and during its 27-year history, trained around 8500 teachers. The closure of the college in 1974 was the end of an era and nothing remains at the site to indicate its existence except for a memorial stone.

Auckland University's School Of Engineering was established at the aerodrome in 1948, using old World War II military barracks and hangars. It remained there until 1969, when it moved to a much larger new building in Symonds Street in central Auckland, near the University's other faculties. While at Ardmore, the school offered only Civil, Mechanical, and Electrical Engineering degrees. After moving in 1969, it further offered Chemical & Material Engineering and Engineering Science degree course.

The aerodrome was used for the NZ Grands Prix in the 1950s and 1960s before Pukekohe Park Raceway was completed. Bruce McLaren was a winner there, and the circuit hosted many famous drivers including Jack Brabham, Prince Bira, Stirling Moss and Reg Parnell.

Demographics

Ardmore had a population of 1,386 at the 2018 New Zealand census, an increase of 90 people (6.9%) since the 2013 census, and an increase of 195 people (16.4%) since the 2006 census. There were 426 households, comprising 714 males and 669 females, giving a sex ratio of 1.07 males per female. The median age was 41.1 years (compared with 37.4 years nationally), with 273 people (19.7%) aged under 15 years, 249 (18.0%) aged 15 to 29, 669 (48.3%) aged 30 to 64, and 192 (13.9%) aged 65 or older.

Ethnicities were 84.0% European/Pākehā, 18.6% Māori, 5.2% Pacific peoples, 7.6% Asian, and 2.4% other ethnicities. People may identify with more than one ethnicity.

The percentage of people born overseas was 18.4, compared with 27.1% nationally.

Although some people chose not to answer the census's question about religious affiliation, 47.8% had no religion, 39.2% were Christian, 1.1% had Māori religious beliefs, 0.9% were Hindu, 0.4% were Muslim, 0.9% were Buddhist and 3.0% had other religions.

Of those at least 15 years old, 210 (18.9%) people had a bachelor's or higher degree, and 162 (14.6%) people had no formal qualifications. The median income was $40,700, compared with $31,800 nationally. 291 people (26.1%) earned over $70,000 compared to 17.2% nationally. The employment status of those at least 15 was that 633 (56.9%) people were employed full-time, 150 (13.5%) were part-time, and 45 (4.0%) were unemployed.

Education

References

External links 

Photographs of Ardmore held in Auckland Libraries' heritage collections.

Populated places in the Auckland Region